Yggdrasil is a Nordic music ensemble based in the Faroe Islands. The band was formed in 1981 by the composer and pianist Kristian Blak, who has written most of the material for the group. From the very beginning, Yggdrasil has included musicians from other countries, having varied musical backgrounds, mainly in jazz, but also in ethnic, folk, rock and classical music.

Most of their works have been created in relation with other forms of art: visual art, poetry, ballet, opera - or in some cases, with nature (concertos in sea caves). The compositions draw ideas and themes from ethnic material from the North Atlantic region, such as Faroese ballads, hymns and rhymes, Inuit songs or Shetland folk music.  Improvisation takes a large part in the interpretation and ranges from free and ethno-jazz to classical and world music.

The band is named after the world tree Yggdrasil in Norse mythology.

Band members

Past and current members include
 Anders Hagberg, flute and saxophone
 Anders Jormin, bass
 Angelika Niesen, violin
 Brandur Jacobsen, drums
 Eivør Pálsdóttir, vocals
 Ernst Dalsgard, flute
 Heðin Ziska Davidsen, guitar
 John Tchicai, saxophone
 Kári Sverisson, vocals
 Karin Korpelainen - drums
 Kristian Blak, piano
 Lelle Kullgren, guitar
 Mia Káradóttir, flute
 Mikael Blak, bass
 Ólavur Øster, guitar
 Rasmus Lyberth, vocal
 Tore Brunborg, saxophone
 Villu Veski, saxophone

Discography

 Den Yderste Ø (HJF 12, Tutl 1981) - poems by William Heinesen
 Ravnating (HJF 13, Tutl 1982) - dia show by Philippe Carré
 Heygar og Dreygar  - folk belief of the Faroe Islands, paper collages from William Heinesen /The Four Towers  ballet based on the poem "Barnetegning" by William Heinesen (HJF 15/19, Tutl 1985)
 Concerto Grotto  - with Faroese nature as a musical partner /Drangar - music written to the "sculpture" in Faroese nature (HJF 33, Tutl 1984 / 1993)
 Brøytingar (HJF 21, Tutl 1988) - concept and artworks by Ole Wich
 Yggdrasil (HJF 88, Tutl 2002) - featuring Eivør Pálsdóttir
 Live in Rudolstadt (HJF 99, Tutl 2004) - featuring Eivør Pálsdóttir (live recording from the 2003 TFF Rudolstadt)
 The Tübingen Concert (2 DVD, HJF 122DVD, Tutl 2005) - live recording at the University Hospital Tübingen (Germany)
 Risastova (HJF 111, Tutl 2006 ) - featuring Kári Sverrisson, as well as the suite "Vágatunnilin" (Tunnel Music)
 Askur (2 CD, HJF 133, Tutl 2007) - live recordings 1982-2006
 Grót & Vatn (HJF 233, Tutl 2012) - live recording at The Nordic House Tórshavn (Faroe Islands)

References

External links
 Kristian Blak personal site

Faroese folk musical groups
Musical groups established in 1981
Norse mythology in music